Dov Hoenig (born April 24, 1932) is an American film editor. He was nominated at the 66th Academy Awards for Best Film Editing for the 1993 film The Fugitive, sharing the nomination with Don Brochu, David Finfer, Dean Goodhill, Richard Nord and Dennis Virkler.

Hoenig has edited on other films, such as The Last of the Mohicans, Diamonds, Operation Thunderbolt, Manhunter, She's Out of Control, Overboard, A Perfect Murder, Under Siege and Collateral Damage. He has also been a member of the American Cinema Editors.

References

External links 

1932 births
Living people
American film editors
Place of birth missing (living people)
American Cinema Editors